Christmas in Vienna VI (also known as Christmastime in Vienna) is the seventh album in a series of Christmas concerts recorded in Vienna with Spanish tenor Plácido Domingo. The concert that the recording comes from was the seventh Christmas in Vienna show that Domingo held since 1992, and the sixth concert recording to be released by Sony Classical. (The Erato label released the fourth Christmas in Vienna concert from 1995 that Domingo held with José Carreras and Natalie Cole.) Recorded in December 1998, it also includes the French singer Patricia Kaas and the Mexican singer Alejandro Fernández with the Vienna Symphony Orchestra directed by Steven Mercurio. The album was released in September 1999.

Track listing 
 "Announcing Christmas" (Christian Kolonovits) - 2:48
 "Y nos vamos pa' Belén" (José María Cano) - 3:02
 "Leise rieselt der Schnee" (Eduard Ebel) - 3:00
 "Canción de cuna (para Jesús)" (Samantha Domingo, Plácido Domingo Jr.) Orchestration by Juan J. Colomer- 3:04
 "Merry Christmas, Baby" (Steven Krikorian, John Keller) - 4:11
 "El niño del tambor" (Katherine K. Davis) - 4:26
 "It Came Upon the Midnight Clear" (Richard Willis, Edmund Sears) - 2:34
 "Here Is Christmas" (Nancy Wilson, Ann Wilson, Richie Zito) - 4:26
 "Amours Eternels (Midnight in Moscow)" (Vassilji Solovjev-Sedoj, Philippe Bergman) - 4:23
 "Blanca Navidad" (Irving Berlin) - 3:22
 "Por el Valle de Rosas" (Miguel Bernal Jiménez) - 2:48
Christmas Medley:
 12. "Ihr Kinderlein kommet" (Christoph Von Schmidt, Johann Abraham Peter Schulz) - 1:53
 13. "Have Yourself a Merry Little Christmas" (Hugh Martin, Ralph Blane) - 2:48
 14. "Jeg er saa glad hver julekveld" (Traditional) - 1:10
 15. "Buenos reyes" (Traditional) - 2:15
 16. "Christmas Must Be Tonight" (Robbie Robertson) - 2:38
 17. "Hay que sembrar en Navidad" (Manuel Alejandro) - 4:18
 18. "Il est né le divin enfant" (Traditional) - 1:15
 19. "Mary's Boy Child" (Jester Hairston) - 2:40
 20. "Ding, Dong Merrily on High" (George Ratcliffe Woodward) - 2:13
<li> "Encore: Silent Night" (Franz Gruber) - 5:01

Personnel 

José María Cano – Arranger
Juan Colomer – Arranger
Jacques Dessange – Hair Stylist
Steven Epstein – Audio Production
Alejandro Fernández – Performer
Ellen Fitton – Editing Engineer
David Foil – Liner Notes
Andy Granger – Recording Technician
Patricia Kaas – Performer
Janush Kawa – Photography
Stephane Kijek – Monitor Engineer
Richard King – Mixing
Christian Kolonovits – Arranger
Bob Rapley – Engineer
Vienna Symphony Orchestra – Performer
Michael Vogts – Sound Technician
Charlote Willer – Make-Up
Tim Wood – Technical Supervisor
Jen Wyler – Assistant Engineer
Axel Zeininger – Photography
Elisabeth Ziegler – Choir Master
Joel Zimmerman – Design

Сharts

See also
 Christmas in Vienna
 Christmas in Vienna II
 Christmas in Vienna III

References

External links
 

1999 Christmas albums
1999 live albums
Live Christmas albums
Plácido Domingo albums
Patricia Kaas albums
Alejandro Fernández live albums
Christmas albums by Spanish artists
Christmas albums by French artists
Christmas albums by Mexican artists
Classical Christmas albums